The Atherton Bridge is a historic iron truss bridge in Lancaster, Massachusetts, spanning the South Branch of the Nashua River. It is a rare example of a hybrid pony truss that is similar to the 19th century truss design of Simeon S. Post. It was built by J. H. Cofrode & Co. of Philadelphia in 1870. It was the first iron bridge to be constructed in the town. The bridge was added to the National Register of Historic Places in 1979.

The bridge formerly carried Bolton Road, but was closed to vehicular traffic in 1975 and bypassed by a modern highway bridge in the 1980s.

The bridge remained open to pedestrian traffic until April 2020, when a flash flood damaged the bridge's wooden deck and it was closed to all traffic. The long-term future of the bridge is uncertain.

The sign commemorating Atherton Bridge states:

Technical information
The Atherton Bridge has iron compression posts that incline inward towards the center of the span and diagonal tension rods that incline outward towards the abutments. Unusual features include double end posts with adjustable turnbuckles, channeled castings to join the lower chord bars, and patented Phoenix columns for all inclined posts. This bridge does not make use of Simeon Post's patented joints. The floor beams support a wood plank deck.

It rests on granite abutments.

The bridge was photographed in 1979 by Jet Lowe of the Historic American Engineering Record, and documented in 1990 as part of the Massachusetts Historic Bridge Project. At that time, it was one of only two known examples of the Post type of truss still surviving.

See also

Ponakin Bridge
National Register of Historic Places listings in Worcester County, Massachusetts
List of bridges documented by the Historic American Engineering Record in Massachusetts
List of bridges on the National Register of Historic Places in Massachusetts

References

External links

Road bridges on the National Register of Historic Places in Massachusetts
Bridges in Worcester County, Massachusetts
Pedestrian bridges in Massachusetts
Former road bridges in the United States
Buildings and structures in Lancaster, Massachusetts
Historic American Engineering Record in Massachusetts
National Register of Historic Places in Worcester County, Massachusetts
1870 establishments in Massachusetts